Jessica Becker may refer to:
 Jessica Becker (bodyboarder)
 Jessica Becker (footballer)